Angela Punch McGregor (born 21 January 1953, in Sydney) is an Australian stage and film actress.

Filmography

Film

Television

Acting teaching
McGregor has taught young people getting into the theatrical business at The Hub Studio in Sydney, Australia. One of her classes was titled Angela Punch McGregor Master Class - Series 1.

References

External links 
 
 Urban Cine File: The World of Film in Australia - on the Internet(Wayback Machine)

1953 births
Living people
Australian television actresses
Australian film actresses
Actresses from Sydney
Best Actress AACTA Award winners
Best Supporting Actress AACTA Award winners